Albert Park may refer to:

In Australia:
 Albert Park, Lismore, home to international baseball stadium Baxter Field
 Albert Park, Victoria, a suburb of Melbourne
 Albert Park and Lake, the park itself
 Albert Park Circuit, the track currently used for Formula One races
 Albert Park Football Club, an amateur football club
 Albert Park Football Club (VFA), a former football club from the 1860s and 1870s
 Albert Park light rail station, a light rail station served by the 96 tram
 Electoral district of Albert Park, an electoral district in Victoria
 Albert Park, South Australia

In Canada:
 Albert Park, Calgary, Alberta

In the Democratic Republic of the Congo:
 Virunga National Park, a wildlife park formerly known as Albert National Park

In Fiji:
 Albert Park (Suva), Fiji

In New Zealand:
 Albert Park, Auckland

In United States:
 Albert Park, New York, New York
 Albert Park, San Rafael, California

In the United Kingdom:
 Albert Park, Abingdon, Berkshire, England
 Albert Park, Hawick, home ground of Hawick Royal Albert F.C.
 Albert Park, Middlesbrough, North Yorkshire, England
 Albert Park, Lower Broughton, Salford, England

See also
 Albert College Park (Dublin), Ireland